Quercus pacifica is a species of oak known by the common names island scrub oak, Channel Island scrub oak, and Pacific oak.

Description

The leaves are roughly oval in shape and edged with pointed teeth. They have shiny upper surfaces and waxy, hairy, glandular undersides.

This oak often produces a stable hybrid with Quercus lobata, that has been named Quercus × macdonaldii.

Distribution
It is endemic to the Channel Islands of California, where it is known from the islands of Santa Cruz, Santa Rosa, and Santa Catalina. The islands of Santa Cruz and Santa Rosa are part of Channel Islands National Park.

Though limited to three islands, it is not uncommon there, occurring in grassland, chaparral, oak woodlands, forest, and other habitat. It is the dominant oak in many areas on Catalina Island. It was described as a new species in 1994 from a specimen collected on Santa Cruz Island. More than a century earlier, the same plant was described as a variety of Quercus dumosa; the 1994 name is nevertheless the correct name for the plant when recognized as a species because names hold priority status only within a given rank.

Threats 
This oak species is threatened by a pathogenic honey fungus (Armillaria sp.), which has been noted to infect trees already stressed by the activity of feral herbivores, including goats and pigs.

A new species of fungus was discovered growing in oak galls on this oak species and was named Penicillium cecidicola in 2004.

References

External links
 
 The Nature Conservancy
 

pacifica
Endemic flora of California
Natural history of the California chaparral and woodlands
Natural history of the Channel Islands of California
Plants described in 1994
Channel Islands National Park